Kakuna taibaiensis is a species of planthopper from China.

Etymology
The specific name was derived from Mount Taibai, the locality in Shaanxi where it was identified.

Description
The hind legs have 17 spines running from the tibia to the second tarsomere. The aedeagus is arched and tube-shaped. The female has not yet been described.

The species is brownish in general coloration, with a milky stripe adorning the dorsum.  The abdomen is dark brown to grey.  The first two pairs of legs are brown, while the hind legs are yellowish brown and covered in black spines.  The wings are yellowish-brown.

Distribution
K. taibaiensis is only found around Mount Taibai in the Shaanxi province of northwestern China.

References

Delphacinae
Insects of China
Insects described in 2014
Endemic fauna of China